Aaradhane is a 1984 Indian Kannada film,  directed by Deepak Balraj and produced by BVB. The film stars Vishnuvardhan, Geetha, Hema Choudhary, K.S.Ashwath and Shivaram in lead roles.

Cast
Vishnuvardhan
Geetha
Hema Choudhary
K S Ashwath
Shivaram

References

External links
 
 

1984 films
1980s Kannada-language films